Rebecca Zhu (born 2 December 1987) is a Hong Kong actress and a beauty pageant titleholder who was crowned Miss Hong Kong 2011. As a result of her pageant win, Zhu was offered a starring role in the 2012 TVB television drama Silver Spoon, Sterling Shackles, which was also her acting debut.

Early life
Zhu was born in Suzhou, Jiangsu, China. Following her mother's wishes, Zhu started dancing lessons as early as the age of 3, taking Latin dance and Chinese dance courses. When she was 10, Zhu moved to Shanghai after earning the opportunity to perform for a ballet dance troupe there. At age 16, Zhu was accepted by the Hong Kong Academy for Performing Arts and moved to Hong Kong, where she continued to study ballet. Zhu earned full scholarship to study abroad at the John F. Kennedy Center for the Performing Arts in Washington, D.C. Upon graduation, Zhu became a member of The Hong Kong Ballet Company.

Career

Pageant debut
In 2011, Rebecca Zhu entered the Miss Hong Kong pageant as contestant #5, a local delegate. Zhu stayed as one of the most popular contestants throughout the competition. She eventually won the title, also winning Miss Trendy Vision, Happiness Ambassador, and the Most Popular Award. Zhu then went on to compete in the Miss Chinese International Pageant the following year. Although she failed to get placed in the pageant, she won the Greater China Elegance Award.

Acting career
In November 2011, Zhu was cast in the TVB blockbuster drama Silver Spoon, Sterling Shackles, which also became Zhu's acting debut. The role was originally meant for Fala Chen, who turned down the offer last-minute due to health reasons. The drama's producer stated that Zhu's resemblance to Chen was one of the reasons why he decided to replace her with Zhu. The drama aired in 2012. Zhu's first performance was not well-received, which many critics reasoned was because of the language barrier (Zhu's native tongue is Mandarin Chinese), as well as her lack of acting experience prior to taking on the role.

Zhu pursued supporting roles for the next few years. Her performances in 2013 dramas Triumph in the Skies II and Always and Ever earned her nominations for Most Promising Female Artiste and Favourite Supporting Actress at the 2013 TVB Star Awards Malaysia, which were her first acting nominations.

In 2017, Zhu won the Best Supporting Actress award at the 2017 TVB Anniversary Awards with her role in the drama A General, a Scholar, and a Eunuch. However, this stirred up controversies among audience and netizens. In 2018, she played her first female leading role in the drama The Stunt. With her role in the drama  Fist Fight, Zhu garnered her first Best Actress nomination at the 2018 TVB Anniversary Awards.

Zhu is good friends with Wonder Women co-actresses Miriam Yeung and Alice Chan.

Filmography

Television dramas (TVB)

Television dramas (Shaw Brothers Studio)

Film

Awards and nominations

References

External links
Rebecca Zhu at Official TVB Blog
Rebecca Zhu at Official Miss Hong Kong 2011 website
Rebecca Zhu at Sina Weibo

1987 births
Alumni of The Hong Kong Academy for Performing Arts
Living people
Actresses from Suzhou
Miss Hong Kong winners
TVB actors
Hong Kong film actresses
Hong Kong television actresses
Actresses from Jiangsu
21st-century Hong Kong actresses